Gordon Thompson was a songwriter who co-wrote the song "The Thing-Ummy Bob" with David Heneker.

References

British songwriters
Year of birth missing
Year of death missing
Place of birth missing
Place of death missing